State Route 18 (SR 18) is a  state highway that travels west-to-east through portions of Troup, Harris, Meriwether, Pike, Lamar, Monroe, Jones, Wilkinson, and Twiggs counties in the western and central parts of the U.S. state of Georgia. The highway connects US 29/SR 14 in West Point, just east of the Alabama state line, with US 80/SR 19/SR 96 in Jeffersonville, via Pine Mountain, Greenville, Zebulon, Barnesville, Forsyth, Gray, and Gordon.

Route description
SR 18 travels east from its western terminus in West Point in Troup County, crosses I-85 just east of West Point, and dips slightly southeasterly into northern Harris County, where is crosses I-185 and continues to Pine Mountain on the county line with Meriwether County.  Turning northeast, SR 18 travels to Greenville in central Meriwether County, and is concurrent with US 27/SR 1 from their intersection south of Greenville into downtown Greenville, where SR 18 turns southeast, is concurrent with SR 109, and travels to Woodbury.

Turning east and crossing into Pike County, the route again turns northeast and travels through Molena, where its concurrency with SR 109 ends, into Concord, where it curves east and travels to Zebulon. Curving once again to the southeast, SR 18 crosses into Lamar County and travels to and around Barnesville, where it begins a concurrency with US 41/SR 7, before heading into Forsyth in Monroe County, ending its concurrency with US 41, and where it crosses I-75 shortly after leaving Forsyth. The highway continues east into Jones County and enters Gray, where it is briefly concurrent with US 129, SR 11, and SR 22, and where it turns southeast once more in the direction of Gordon in Wilkinson County.

In Gordon, the highway turns south and southeast, crosses into Twiggs County, and reaches its eastern terminus in Jeffersonville.

History

1920s to 1940s
SR 18 was established at least as early as 1919 on its current path, from Greenville to Barnesville. By the end of September 1921, it was extended south-southeast on a concurrency with SR 41 to Harris, then on a sole path southwest to SR 1 in Chipley. Between October 1926 and October 1929, the Chipley–Harris segment had a "completed hard surface". By the middle of 1930, the Harris–Greenville segment also had a completed hard surface. In February 1932, SR 18 was established on a segment from Forsyth to Gray. However, there was no indication if they were connected via a concurrency with US 41/SR 19. In September, a portion east of Greenville had a completed hard surface. In May 1933, the entire Greenville–Woodbury segment was completed. In February 1934, SR 18 was extended westward to West Point. Just over two years later, a portion west of Zebulon was completed. Between September 1938 and July 1939, the path of SR 19 from Barnesville to just southeast of Forsyth was truncated to the latter point. SR 18 was designated on this segment instead. It was also extended southeast from Gray to SR 57 south of Gordon. The segment from Barnesville to southeast of Forsyth, a portion south-southeast of Gray; and the portion south of Gordon all had a completed hard surface. In 1942, two segments had a completed hard surface: a portion west of Chipley and from Woodbury to the approximate location of Molena. Two years later, SR 18 was extended south-southwest to Jeffersonville. Between the beginning of 1945 and November 1946, the entire Woodbury–Zebulon segment was hard surfaced. By February 1948, two segments were also hard surfaced: the West Point–Chipley segment and from Gray to south-southwest of Gordon.

1950s to 2000s
Between April 1949 and August 1950, US 27 Alt. was designated on the Harris City–Greensville segment. Two segments were hard surfaced: the Zebulon–Barnesville segment and the western part of the Monroe County portion of the Forsyth–Gray segment. By the beginning of 1952, the entire eastern part of this last segment (except for the eastern end) was hard surfaced. In 1953, the extreme eastern end of this segment was also hard surfaced. Between June 1954 and June 1955, the portion of SR 18 from south of Gordon to Jeffersonville was hard surfaced. By July 1957, a portion west-southwest of Gray was also hard surfaced. Between June 1960 and June 1963, the Junes County portion of the Forsyth–Gray segment was hard surfaced. By the beginning of 1966, the southern part of a south-southwest bypass of Barnesville was proposed from SR 18 in Aldora to an unnumbered road south of Barnesville. In 1967, the bypass was built as part of US 341/SR 7. In 1986, the path of SR 18 was rerouted in Barnesville: it traveled north on US 341/SR 7, then south-southeast on US 41, before resuming its previous path. In 1993, part of a southern bypass of Gray, designated as SR 932, was proposed from US 129/SR 11/SR 18/SR 22 in the southwest part of the city to SR 18 in the southeastern part of it. Five years later, the path of SR 18 in Griffin was shifted southward, replacing the proposed path of SR 932. In 2007, the path of US 41/SR 18 in the Barnesville area was shifted southward, truncating the path of US 341/SR 7 to the current northern terminus.

Major intersections

Special route

State Route 18 Spur (SR 18 Spur) was a spur route of SR 18 that existed completely within the city limits of Gordon. Between June 1963 and the beginning of 1966, it was established from SR 18 to SR 243. In 2012, this spur route was decommissioned.

See also

References

External links

 
 Georgia Roads (Routes 1 - 20)

018
Transportation in Troup County, Georgia
Transportation in Harris County, Georgia
Transportation in Meriwether County, Georgia
Transportation in Pike County, Georgia
Transportation in Lamar County, Georgia
Transportation in Monroe County, Georgia
Transportation in Jones County, Georgia
Transportation in Wilkinson County, Georgia
Transportation in Twiggs County, Georgia